Radio Jablanica is a Bosnian local public radio station, broadcasting from Jablanica, Bosnia and Herzegovina.

It was launched on 22 February 1999 by JP RTV JABLANICA d.o.o. Jablanica. This radio station broadcasts a variety of programs such as music, talk shows and local news.

Program is mainly produced in Bosnian language. Estimated number of potential listeners of Radio Jablanica is around 13,498.

The radio station is also available in municipalities Konjic, Prozor and Mostar. 
Local cable television channel RTV Jablanica is also part of public municipality services.

Frequencies
 Jablanica

See also 
List of radio stations in Bosnia and Herzegovina

References

External links 
 www.fmscan.org
 www.jablanica.ba
 www.rtvjablanica.ba
 Communications Regulatory Agency of Bosnia and Herzegovina

Jablanica
Radio stations established in 1999